DeAnn Kay Vaught (born 1970) is a farmer from Horatio, Arkansas, who is a Republican member of the Arkansas House of Representatives for District 4.

Vaught graduated from Southern Arkansas University in Magnolia. She is affiliated with the Farm Bureau Federation. She and her husband, Jon, reside in Horatio with their three children. She is a Baptist.

In 2014, she unseated Democrat Fonda Hawthorne of Ashdown, winning 59 to 41 percent. Vaught sat on the Select Committee for Rules, the committee on Aging, Children and Youth Legislative and Military Affairs, the committee for Revenue and Taxation, and the committee for Legislative Joint Auditory Commerce.

References

1969 births
Living people
Republican Party members of the Arkansas House of Representatives
People from Sevier County, Arkansas
American women farmers
Southern Arkansas University alumni
Baptists from Arkansas
Women state legislators in Arkansas
Farmers from Arkansas
21st-century American politicians
21st-century American women politicians